Xiǎolùkǒu (小路口) could refer to:

 Xiaolukou, Qimen County, town in southeastern Anhui, China
 Xiaolukou, Liangshan County, town in Liangshan County, Shandong, China